Sangita Madhavan Nair is an Indian actress, who has worked in Malayalam, Tamil and Kannada film industries, predominantly in the 1990s.

The actress is best known for her role as Shyamala in Chinthavishtayaya Shyamala, which was written and directed by Sreenivasan, for which she has won the Kerala State Film Award for Best Actress. She is also well known for her role of Nirmala Mary in actor Vijay's breakthrough film Poove Unakkaga (1996).

She started her career as a child artiste in the movie Snehikkan Oru Pennu, a Malayalam movie released in 1978. Her debut film as a child artist in Tamil was En Rathathin Rathame, which is the Tamil remake of Hindi movie Mr. India. The first film she acted as a heroine was Ellame En Rasathan in 1995.

Personal life
She was born as the youngest among four children, to Madhavan Nair from Kottakkal, Malappuram and mother, Padma from Kuzhalmannam, Palakkad, settled in Chennai. Her father migrated to Chennai for fruit business and the family settled there. She had her primary education from Sri Gujarati Vid Matriculation School, Chennai. She has two sisters, Mallika and Charu and a brother, Nitheesh. Her brother portrayed a supporting role in her unreleased film, Punniyavathi. 

She married cinematographer S. Saravanan in 2000 and retired from acting after marriage. The couple have a daughter Saai Thejaswathy born in 2002. She assisted her husband when he directed his first film, Silambattam starring Silambarasan, Sana Khan and Sneha.

Awards and honours

Partial filmography

References

External links

Sangita at MSI

Indian film actresses
Living people
Actresses in Telugu cinema
Kerala State Film Award winners
Actresses in Tamil cinema
Actresses in Malayalam cinema
Actresses from Kerala
20th-century Indian actresses
21st-century Indian actresses
Year of birth missing (living people)
People from Malappuram district
Actresses from Chennai
Actresses in Kannada cinema
Child actresses in Malayalam cinema